Sompio Strict Nature Reserve is a strict nature reserve located in Lapland, Finland. The primary objective is to preserve forest, fjeld and mire nature. The core of the strict nature reserve is formed by the Nattastunturit Fjelds. Roaming in the reserve is allowed only along marked trails.

References

Strict nature reserves of Finland
Protected areas of the Arctic
Geography of Lapland (Finland)
Sodankylä